The Higher International General Certificate of Secondary Education (HIGCSE) is a certification offered by Cambridge University for various subjects. It is designed for Southern Africa and offered by many public, private and homeschooling organisations.

It is considered to be equivalent to matric in most countries, but is generally of higher standard and can be used to enter into some universities around the world, including Cambridge University. A student can go on to study a subject on A2 after acquiring an HIGCSE qualification in that subject (a small bridging course is required in some cases).

References

External links 
British Council of South Africa

Education in South Africa